Mirko Mihić (born July 24, 1965) is a Serbian football coach and retired player.

Club career
Born in Belgrade, Serbia, Mihić played as a striker for FK Sloboda Tuzla in the Yugoslav First League. He also played in the Yugoslav First League with Hajduk Split, FK Rad and FK Zemun. He would later join Eordaikos F.C. in the Greek second division and Kavala F.C. in the Greek first division. He finished his career in Cyprus with Nea Salamis Famagusta FC.

International career
He participated for Yugoslavia at the 1988 Olympic Games. He was coach at Nea Salamis for a short period end 2009.

References

External links
 
 

1965 births
Living people
Footballers from Belgrade
Serbs of Bosnia and Herzegovina
Association football forwards
Yugoslav footballers
Olympic footballers of Yugoslavia
Footballers at the 1988 Summer Olympics
Serbia and Montenegro footballers
FK Sloboda Tuzla players
HNK Hajduk Split players
FK Rad players
FK Zemun players
Eordaikos 2007 F.C. players
Kavala F.C. players
AEL Limassol players
Nea Salamis Famagusta FC players
Yugoslav First League players
Football League (Greece) players
Super League Greece players
Cypriot First Division players
Serbia and Montenegro expatriate footballers
Expatriate footballers in Greece
Serbia and Montenegro expatriate sportspeople in Greece
Expatriate footballers in Cyprus
Serbia and Montenegro expatriate sportspeople in Cyprus
Nea Salamis Famagusta FC managers
Serbian expatriate football managers
Expatriate football managers in Cyprus
Serbian expatriate sportspeople in Cyprus